Phil Baugh (December 13, 1936 – November 4, 1990) was an American guitarist. He was known as one of the leading hot country guitarists whose "playing exuded joy and humor." He was active from the 1960s through the 1980s, performing as a highly sought-after session musician as well as a top recording artist in his own right.

Biography
Phil Baugh was born in Olivehurst, California in 1936. Baugh signed a deal with Crest Records in 1962. With promotion from Longhorn Records in Dallas, Texas his song "Country Guitar" became a hit. He then recorded an album called Country Guitar II as a follow-up. He continued to work in Southern California, including joining Ray Price's band in 1969. In 1975 he moved to Nashville where he became a popular session guitarist. In the 1980s he was part of a country/jazz band called The Nashville Superpickers. The lineup included steel guitarist Buddy Emmons, drummer Buddy Harman, bassist Henry Strzelecki, pianist Willie Rainsford and harmonica player Terry McMillan. He suffered a coronary in 1985 and died five years later at the age of 53.

Baugh's "Country Guitar" and "One Man Band" were top 40 hits on Billboard's country chart during 1965.

Guitars
Phil Baugh was one of the great country Fender Telecaster players along with James Burton and Don Rich. The entire album "Live Wire!" was recorded with his signature heavily customized Telecaster. But he also had other guitars, including a custom made doubleneck guitar from Mosrite and a Chet Atkins model Gretsch.

Discography

Albums

Singles

Awards
 "Best Guitarist" by the ACM 1965
 "Outstanding Instrumentalist of the Year" by Billboard 1965
 "Instrumentalist of the Year" by Cash Box 1965
 Nominated for a Grammy Award in 1979 for his performance with The Nashville Superpickers on The Austin City Limits

See also
List of Telecaster players

External links

References

1936 births
1990 deaths
People from Yuba County, California
American country guitarists
American male guitarists
American country singer-songwriters
Crest Records artists
Era Records artists
Longhorn Records artists
20th-century American singers
20th-century American guitarists
20th-century American male musicians
Country musicians from California
American male singer-songwriters
Singer-songwriters from California